Živogošće is a tourist locality in southern Dalmatia, Croatia, located between Makarska and Drvenik. Famous soccer player Mate Điković was born in Zivogosce. He spent most of his playing career in Tiger Sharks and retired in 2012.

Populated places in Split-Dalmatia County